The 1989–90 NBA season was the Bullets' 29th season in the National Basketball Association. The Bullets had the ninth pick in the 1989 NBA draft, and selected Tom Hammonds out of Georgia Tech. The Bullets got off to a fast start winning five of their first six games. However, they would struggle losing 10 of their next 13 games, but would climb back into playoff connection with a 12–11 record in mid December. However, their playoff hopes faded quickly as they lost 14 of their next 16 games, and held a 18–31 record at the All-Star break. The Bullets finished fourth in the Atlantic Division with a 31–51 record,

Jeff Malone led the team in scoring averaging 24.3 points per game, while Bernard King averaged 22.3 points per game, and John "Hot Plate" Williams provided the team with 18.2 points, 7.6 rebounds and 4.7 assists per game, but went down with a knee injury after only playing just 18 games. In addition, second-year guard Ledell Eackles contributed 13.5 points per game, while Mark Alarie averaged 10.5 points per game, Darrell Walker contributed 9.5 points, 8.8 rebounds, 8.0 assists and 1.7 steals per game, and Charles Jones provided with 6.2 rebounds and 2.4 blocks per game. 

Following the season, Malone was traded to the Sacramento Kings, who then dealt him to the Utah Jazz after seven seasons with the Bullets.

Draft picks

Roster

Regular season

Season standings

z - clinched division title
y - clinched division title
x - clinched playoff spot

Record vs. opponents

Game log

Regular season

|- align="center" bgcolor="#ccffcc"
| 1
| November 3
| @ Charlotte
| W 116–96
|
|
|
| Charlotte Coliseum
| 1–0
|- align="center" bgcolor="#ffcccc"
| 2
| November 4
| Detroit
| L 93–95
|
|
|
| Capital Centre
| 1–1
|- align="center" bgcolor="#ccffcc"
| 3
| November 7
| @ Atlanta
| W 118–114
|
|
|
| The Omni
| 2–1
|- align="center" bgcolor="#ccffcc"
| 4
| November 8
| Boston
| W 112–103
|
|
|
| Capital Centre
| 3–1
|- align="center" bgcolor="#ccffcc"
| 5
| November 10
| Cleveland(at Baltimore, Maryland)
| W 100–92
|
|
|
| Baltimore Arena
| 4–1
|- align="center" bgcolor="#ccffcc"
| 6
| November 12
| @ Portland
| W 104–95
|
|
|
| Memorial Coliseum
| 5–1
|- align="center" bgcolor="#ffcccc"
| 7
| November 13
| @ Utah
| L 93–106
|
|
|
| Salt Palace
| 5–2
|- align="center" bgcolor="#ffcccc"
| 8
| November 15
| @ Denver
| L 98–109
|
|
|
| McNichols Sports Arena
| 5–3
|- align="center" bgcolor="#ffcccc"
| 9
| November 16
| @ Seattle
| L 98–111
|
|
|
| Seattle Center Coliseum
| 5–4
|- align="center" bgcolor="#ffcccc"
| 10
| November 18
| @ Phoenix
| L 107–118
|
|
|
| Arizona Veterans Memorial Coliseum
| 5–5
|- align="center" bgcolor="#ffcccc"
| 11
| November 19
| @ L.A. Lakers
| L 115–120
|
|
|
| Great Western Forum
| 5–6
|- align="center" bgcolor="#ccffcc"
| 12
| November 21
| Milwaukee
| W 97–91
|
|
|
| Capital Centre
| 6–6
|- align="center" bgcolor="#ffcccc"
| 13
| November 24
| @ Philadelphia
| L 108–121
|
|
|
| The Spectrum
| 6–7
|- align="center" bgcolor="#ccffcc"
| 14
| November 25
| Miami
| W 107–88
|
|
|
| Capital Centre
| 7–7
|- align="center" bgcolor="#ffcccc"
| 15
| November 28
| @ Cleveland
| L 91–92
|
|
|
| Richfield Coliseum
| 7–8
|- align="center" bgcolor="#ffcccc"
| 16
| November 29
| Atlanta
| L 104–111
|
|
|
| Capital Centre
| 7–9

|- align="center" bgcolor="#ccffcc"
| 17
| December 1
| Philadelphia(at Baltimore, Maryland)
| W 107–90
|
|
|
| Baltimore Arena
| 8–9
|- align="center" bgcolor="#ffcccc"
| 18
| December 2
| Utah
| L 98–100
|
|
|
| Capital Centre
| 8–10
|- align="center" bgcolor="#ffcccc"
| 19
| December 6
| @ Detroit
| L 107–115
|
|
|
| The Palace of Auburn Hills
| 8–11
|- align="center" bgcolor="#ccffcc"
| 20
| December 9
| L.A. Lakers
| W 103–101
|
|
|
| Capital Centre
| 9–11
|- align="center" bgcolor="#ccffcc"
| 21
| December 14
| Charlotte
| W 105–101
|
|
|
| Capital Centre
| 10–11
|- align="center" bgcolor="#ccffcc"
| 22
| December 16
| Dallas
| W 112–108
|
|
|
| Capital Centre
| 11–11
|- align="center" bgcolor="#ccffcc"
| 23
| December 19
| Minnesota
| W 112–99
|
|
|
| Capital Centre
| 12–11
|- align="center" bgcolor="#ffcccc"
| 24
| December 20
| @ Philadelphia
| L 111–118
|
|
|
| The Spectrum
| 12–12
|- align="center" bgcolor="#ffcccc"
| 25
| December 22
| New York
| L 112–122
|
|
|
| Capital Centre
| 12–13
|- align="center" bgcolor="#ffcccc"
| 26
| December 26
| @ New Jersey
| L 94–101
|
|
|
| Brendan Byrne Arena
| 12–14
|- align="center" bgcolor="#ffcccc"
| 27
| December 27
| San Antonio
| L 97–107
|
|
|
| Capital Centre
| 12–15
|- align="center" bgcolor="#ffcccc"
| 28
| December 30
| Chicago
| L 112–117 (OT)
|
|
|
| Capital Centre
| 12–16

|- align="center" bgcolor="#ccffcc"
| 29
| January 2
| New Jersey
| W 110–96
|
|
|
| Capital Centre
| 13–26
|- align="center" bgcolor="#ffcccc"
| 30
| January 3
| @ Boston
| L 101–120
|
|
|
| Boston Garden
| 13–17
|- align="center" bgcolor="#ffcccc"
| 31
| January 5
| @ Cleveland
| L 107–119
|
|
|
| Richfield Coliseum
| 13–18
|- align="center" bgcolor="#ffcccc"
| 32
| January 6
| Boston
| L 88–102
|
|
|
| Capital Centre
| 13–19
|- align="center" bgcolor="#ffcccc"
| 33
| January 9
| @ New York
| L 127–131 (OT)
|
|
|
| Madison Square Garden
| 13–20
|- align="center" bgcolor="#ccffcc"
| 34
| January 11
| @ Miami
| W 100–89
|
|
|
| Miami Arena
| 14–20
|- align="center" bgcolor="#ffcccc"
| 35
| January 13
| Philadelphia
| L 101–120
|
|
|
| Capital Centre
| 14–21
|- align="center" bgcolor="#ffcccc"
| 36
| January 15
| Miami
| L 105–111
|
|
|
| Capital Centre
| 14–22
|- align="center" bgcolor="#ffcccc"
| 37
| January 17
| @ New Jersey
| L 106–115
|
|
|
| Brendan Byrne Arena
| 14–23
|- align="center" bgcolor="#ffcccc"
| 38
| January 18
| Milwaukee
| L 112–115
|
|
|
| Capital Centre
| 14–24
|- align="center" bgcolor="#ffcccc"
| 39
| January 20
| @ Houston
| L 107–127
|
|
|
| The Summit
| 14–25
|- align="center" bgcolor="#ffcccc"
| 40
| January 22
| @ San Antonio
| L 115–124
|
|
|
| HemisFair Arena
| 14–26
|- align="center" bgcolor="#ffcccc"
| 41
| January 23
| @ Dallas
| L 105–129
|
|
|
| Reunion Arena
| 14–27
|- align="center" bgcolor="#ccffcc"
| 42
| January 25
| Boston
| W 112–103
|
|
|
| Capital Centre
| 15–27
|- align="center" bgcolor="#ffcccc"
| 43
| January 27
| @ Philadelphia
| L 101–125
|
|
|
| The Spectrum
| 15–28
|- align="center" bgcolor="#ffcccc"
| 44
| January 31
| @ Detroit
| L 109–133
|
|
|
| The Palace of Auburn Hills
| 15–29

|- align="center" bgcolor="#ccffcc"
| 45
| February 2
| Sacramento
| W 108–99
|
|
|
| Capital Centre
| 16–29
|- align="center" bgcolor="#ffcccc"
| 46
| February 3
| Seattle
| L 92–94
|
|
|
| Capital Centre
| 16–30
|- align="center" bgcolor="#ccffcc"
| 47
| February 5
| Golden State
| W 135–129
|
|
|
| Capital Centre
| 17–30
|- align="center" bgcolor="#ccffcc"
| 48
| February 6
| @ Miami
| W 118–100
|
|
|
| Miami Arena
| 18–30
|- align="center" bgcolor="#ffcccc"
| 49
| February 8
| L.A. Clippers
| L 103–105
|
|
|
| Capital Centre
| 18–31
|- align="center" bgcolor="#ffcccc"
| 50
| February 13
| @ Sacramento
| L 98–106
|
|
|
| ARCO Arena
| 18–32
|- align="center" bgcolor="#ffcccc"
| 51
| February 15
| @ Golden State
| L 107–113
|
|
|
| Oakland–Alameda County Coliseum Arena
| 18–33
|- align="center" bgcolor="#ccffcc"
| 52
| February 16
| @ L.A. Clippers
| W 118–112 (OT)
|
|
|
| Los Angeles Memorial Sports Arena
| 19–33
|- align="center" bgcolor="#ccffcc"
| 53
| February 18
| Indiana(at Baltimore, Maryland)
| W 116–97
|
|
|
| Baltimore Arena
| 20–33
|- align="center" bgcolor="#ccffcc"
| 54
| February 20
| @ Atlanta
| W 110–107
|
|
|
| The Omni
| 21–33
|- align="center" bgcolor="#ffcccc"
| 55
| February 22
| New York
| L 110–119
|
|
|
| Capital Centre
| 21–34
|- align="center" bgcolor="#ccffcc"
| 56
| February 24
| Orlando
| W 141–124
|
|
|
| Capital Centre
| 22–34
|- align="center" bgcolor="#ffcccc"
| 57
| February 27
| @ Minnesota
| L 88–104
|
|
|
| Hubert H. Humphrey Metrodome
| 22–35

|- align="center" bgcolor="#ffcccc"
| 58
| March 1
| Detroit
| L 85–99
|
|
|
| Capital Centre
| 22–36
|- align="center" bgcolor="#ccffcc"
| 59
| March 3
| @ Orlando
| W 132–128 (2OT)
|
|
|
| Orlando Arena
| 23–36
|- align="center" bgcolor="#ffcccc"
| 60
| March 6
| @ Indiana
| L 98–113
|
|
|
| Market Square Arena
| 23–37
|- align="center" bgcolor="#ffcccc"
| 61
| March 7
| Phoenix
| L 111–113
|
|
|
| Capital Centre
| 23–38
|- align="center" bgcolor="#ccffcc"
| 62
| March 9
| @ Boston(at Hartford, Connecticut)
| W 115–108
|
|
|
| Hartford Civic Center
| 24–38
|- align="center" bgcolor="#ffcccc"
| 63
| March 10
| Portland
| L 113–116
|
|
|
| Capital Centre
| 24–39
|- align="center" bgcolor="#ffcccc"
| 64
| March 15
| @ Milwaukee
| L 91–96
|
|
|
| Bradley Center
| 24–40
|- align="center" bgcolor="#ffcccc"
| 65
| March 17
| Atlanta(at Baltimore, Maryland)
| L 92–119
|
|
|
| Baltimore Arena
| 24–41
|- align="center" bgcolor="#ffcccc"
| 66
| March 20
| @ Chicago
| L 97–122
|
|
|
| Chicago Stadium
| 24–42
|- align="center" bgcolor="#ccffcc"
| 67
| March 21
| New Jersey
| W 136–106
|
|
|
| Capital Centre
| 25–42
|- align="center" bgcolor="#ffcccc"
| 68
| March 24
|Philadelphia
| L 112–114 (OT)
|
|
|
| Capital Centre
| 25–43
|- align="center" bgcolor="#ffcccc"
| 69
| March 27
| @ New York
| L 100–119
|
|
|
| Madison Square Garden
| 25–44
|- align="center" bgcolor="#ccffcc"
| 70
| March 28
| Denver
| W 113–99
|
|
|
| Capital Centre
| 26–44
|- align="center" bgcolor="#ccffcc"
| 71
| March 30
| Orlando
| W 143–115
|
|
|
| Capital Centre
| 27–44

|- align="center" bgcolor="#ccffcc"
| 72
| April 1
| @ New Jersey
| W 105–97
|
|
|
| Brendan Byrne Arena
| 28–44
|- align="center" bgcolor="#ffcccc"
| 73
| April 4
| New York
| L 107–118
|
|
|
| Capital Centre
| 28–45
|- align="center" bgcolor="#ccffcc"
| 74
| April 6
| Houston
| W 121–110
|
|
|
| Capital Centre
| 29–45
|- align="center" bgcolor="#ffcccc"
| 75
| April 7
| @ Milwaukee
| L 100–110
|
|
|
| Bradley Center
| 29–46
|- align="center" bgcolor="#ffcccc"
| 76
| April 10
| @ Indiana
| L 105–107
|
|
|
| Market Square Arena
| 29–47
|- align="center" bgcolor="#ffcccc"
| 77
| April 12
| Cleveland
| L 100–102
|
|
|
| Capital Centre
| 29–48
|- align="center" bgcolor="#ccffcc"
| 78
| April 14
| Chicago
| W 113–103
|
|
|
| Capital Centre
| 30–48
|- align="center" bgcolor="#ccffcc"
| 79
| April 17
| @ Orlando
| W 129–127
|
|
|
| Orlando Arena
| 31–48
|- align="center" bgcolor="#ffcccc"
| 80
| April 19
| @ Chicago
| L 117–120
|
|
|
| Chicago Stadium
| 31–49
|- align="center" bgcolor="#ffcccc"
| 81
| April 20
| @ Miami
| L 112–117
|
|
|
| Miami Arena
| 31–50
|- align="center" bgcolor="#ffcccc"
| 82
| April 22
| Indiana
| L 117–127
|
|
|
| Capital Centre
| 31–51

Player statistics

Awards and records

Transactions

References

See also
 1989-90 NBA season

Washington Wizards seasons
Washington Bullets
Washington Bullets
Wash